Elections to Manchester City Council were held on Thursday, 1 May 2003. One third of the council was up for election as well as a vacancy in Benchill, with each successful candidate to serve a one-year term of office, expiring in 2004, due to the boundary changes and 'all-out' elections due to take place in that year. Turnout was down slightly to 22.2%, with Labour retaining overall control of the council. The election saw the Greens winning their first seat, and half a dozen Liberal Democrat gains resulting in Labour's majority being the lowest in twenty years. The three Independent Labour candidates stood as "Independent Progressive Labour".

Election result

After the election, the composition of the council was as follows:

Ward results

Ardwick

Baguley

Barlow Moor

Benchill

Beswick and Clayton

Blackley

Bradford

Brooklands

Burnage

Central

Charlestown

Cheetham

Chorlton

Crumpsall

Didsbury

Fallowfield

Gorton North

Gorton South

Harpurhey

Hulme

Levenshulme

Lightbowne

Longsight

Moss Side

Moston

Newton Heath

Northenden

Old Moat

Rusholme

Sharston

Whalley Range

Withington

Woodhouse Park

References

2003 English local elections
2003
2000s in Manchester